"Still" is a song by English singer Katy B, produced by Geeneus and Fraser T Smith. It was released on 2 May 2014 as the official third and final single from her second studio album, Little Red. The song peaked at number 116 on the UK Singles Chart. The Richy Ahmed remix of the song appears on the soundtrack of the 2014 racing video game Forza Horizon 2.

Music video
The music video for "Still" was released onto Katy B's YouTube channel on 31 March 2014. Produced by Sophie Muller, it features several scenes of Katy B in a white outfit, standing against winter landscapes and white backgrounds, surrounded by light, in order to highlight the color of her hair. In other scenes, Katy sits alone on a glowing table.
The video has a total length of three minutes and twenty-nine seconds, the same length as the song itself.

Track listing

Personnel
 Kathleen "Katy B" Brien - vocals, writer
 Fraser T Smith - producer, writer
 Gordon "Geeneus" Warren - producer, writer
 Jarrad Hearman - mixing

Chart performance
The song charted at number 84 in the HOT40UK, lasting two days in the same position. It was the first single from the album Little Red to chart this low. On the UK Singles Chart, the song peaked at number 116.

References

2014 songs
2014 singles
Katy B songs
Pop ballads
Song recordings produced by Fraser T. Smith
Columbia Records singles
Music videos directed by Sophie Muller